Mercator Serbia or Mercator-S, is a Serbian supermarket chain, a part of Mercator Group, an international retail chain based in Slovenia. As of 2016, it has 15.98% market share in Serbia.

History
The company was established in 2002, when the first Mercator Center Belgrade was opened in New Belgrade. The 50,000 square meter Center was completely renovated and re-opened in 2012.

In October 2006, Mercator bought 76% of Rodić M&B company for 116 million euros and became the major shareholder in Roda Supermarkets. The complete ownership takeover of this company was finished in 2009.

In June 2013, Croatian Agrokor Group initiated   and in June 2014 finished the takeover of Mercator Group, and initiated the integration of their operations in Serbia under the Mercator brand, including Mercator Centers, Roda Megamarkets and IDEA supermarkets. The takeover was approved by the Serbian Commission for the Protection of Competition in December 2013.

In December 2017, Serbian holding company MPC Holding bought Mercator Center Belgrade from the Mercator Serbia for a sum of 46 million euros. As of 31 December 2018, Mercator has 321 retail stores in Serbia, of which 241 are Idea markets, 35 Idea supermarkets, 30 Roda markets, 6 Roda megamarkets and two Mercator hypermarkets.

In August 2019, Mercator Group began the process of selling additional 12 supermarkets across the former Yugoslavia region to cut debts; two of the listed markets for sale are owned by Mercator Serbia.

Gallery

See also
 List of supermarket chains in Serbia

References

External links
 
 Mercator Group

2002 establishments in Serbia
Agrokor
Companies based in Belgrade
D.o.o. companies in Serbia
Retail companies established in 2002
Retail companies of Serbia
Supermarkets of Serbia